Agastache occidentalis  is a species of Agastache first described by Charles Vancouver Piper, and given its current name by Amos Arthur Heller.

Range
It is found in seasonably wet areas west of the Cascades in Oregon and Washington.

References 

occidentalis